Haga Palace, formerly known as the Queen's Pavilion, is located in the Haga Park, Solna Municipality in Metropolitan Stockholm, Sweden. The palace, built between 18021805, was modelled after ballet-master Gallodiers Italian villa in Drottningholm by architect Carl Christoffer Gjörwell on appointment by King Gustaf IV Adolf for the royal children. It has been the home or summerhouse for several members of the Swedish royal family – most notably it was the birthplace of the present King – until 1966 when King Gustaf VI Adolf transferred its disposal to the government and it was turned into a guesthouse for distinguished foreign official visitors. In 2009, it was announced by Prime Minister Fredrik Reinfeldt that the rights of disposal to the palace would be transferred back to the royal court to be used by Victoria, Crown Princess of Sweden and her husband, Prince Daniel, Duke of Västergötland, as a wedding gift in 2010. They moved into Haga Palace after their wedding on 19 June that year.

History
When King Gustaf III was killed in 1792 the work on his grandiose castle at Brunnsviken was cancelled and his son and successor King Gustav IV Adolf instead started building a more modest palace. The King turned to relatively young architect Carl Christoffer Gjörwell with the aim to build a modern house in Italian villa style. Gjörwell had been employed at Haga since 1788 and had studied for Louis Jean Desprez both at the erection of the royal pavilion and with the incomplete castle in Brunnsviken. He was also the architect behind the Echo Temple. He modelled it after ballet-master Gallidiers Italian villa at Drottningholm which Gjörwell had design himself. The foundation was laid-out in May 1802 and already before the end of the year the building was under roof. Building contractor was Herman Edberg who, aside from having skilled craftsmen as bricklayers and carpenters also had a group of infantrymen from Södermanlands regemente at his disposal. In December 1803 The King was informed that the stands were removed and the marble columns were raised. The columns were originally from Finland and had been brought to Poland during the reign of King Sigismund. They were taken back to Sweden by King Gustaf II Adolf and used by Nicodemus Tessin the Younger in the building of the German Church in Karlskrona. When the Church was rebuilt after a massive fire in 1790 14 columns were left available for future use. The floor was made out of oak from Fredrikhovs Castle and the stone was originally intended for King Gustav III:s never completed castle at Brunnsviken. The whole interior was finished at the end of 1805. 

From the 1820s the palace was used as a summer house for Crown Prince Oscar and his consort Josephine. In the 1860 the palace was renovated for King Oscar I's youngest son Prince August and his wife Princess Therese. The Princess lived at Haga Palace until her demise in 1914 and she put her touch to the Palace during her 54-year-long dwelling. 

After the death of Therese the palace was put into disuse by the members of the Royal Family until the newly wedded couple Hereditary Prince Gustaf Adolf and Princess Sibylla relocated there in 1932 after some thorough renovation had been conducted. The Princesses Margaretha, Birgitta, Desiree and Christina and Prince Carl Gustaf, Sweden's present King, were all born there. In the wake of the sudden death of  the Hereditary Prince in an KLM DC-3 airplane crash at Copenhagen Airport on January 26, 1947, the widowed mother and her children ended their full-time residency at the palace.

King Gustaf VI Adolf relinquished the royal disposal rights to the Palace and released it to be used by the Government in 1966 as an official residence for distinguished foreign guests of the Government to Sweden, although it would turn out to be rather sparsely used for that purpose.

On April 23, 2009, Prime Minister Reinfeldt announced that the disposal rights to Haga Palace will be transferred back to the Royal Court as a wedding gift from the government in light of Crown Princess Victoria's approved marriage to Daniel Westling in June 2010. The couple moved in on November 15, 2010.

See also 
Gustav III's Pavilion

References 

Haga Palace at Swedish Royal Court website

External links 
 

Palaces in Stockholm
Official residences in Sweden
Royal residences in Sweden
Houses completed in 1805
Castles in Stockholm County
1805 establishments in Sweden

de:Hagapark#Schloss Haga